The World Junior Squash championships are the official junior tournament in the game of squash conducted by the World Squash Federation (WSF).  Entry is open to individuals aged 19 and below. Since its inception the world juniors has been held biennially with the junior men (individual and team) held one year, junior women (individual and team) the following year. The men's team event was held unofficially from 1973 to 1979. The individuals event (for both men's and women's) are held annually starting from 2009 while the team event remains biennial.

Men's championship

Individual

Team
The team event was started unofficially in April 1973 to coincide with the British Junior Open tournament which was held annually in Britain. Only four countries (England, Scotland, Wales and Sweden) took part in the event which was held at the courts of the National Westminster Bank Sports Ground in South London, playing for a shield presented by the bank.

The official men's world team championship tournament has been held since 1980. It has been won by 4 countries. The record number of countries participating in a single men's team tournament is 31, in the 2000 and the 2008 tournament held in Milan, Italy and Zürich, Switzerland respectively.

Women's championship

Individual
The women's individual championship is the WSA Junior Tier 1 tournament and players who compete in the tournament will be awarded ranking points for the official "Rising Stars" rankings.

Team
Official women's world team championship tournaments has been held between 1985 and now. It has been won by 4 different countries. The record number of countries participating in a single tournament is 20, in the 2005 tournament held in Herentals, Belgium.

Statistics

Titles by country (Men)

Individual

Team

Titles by country (Women)

Individual

Team

See also
 World Junior Squash Circuit
 World Team Squash Championships
 World Open
 British Junior Open Squash

Notes

 The men's team event was held unofficially from 1973 to 1979.

References

External links
World Junior Championship 2016 host official website 
2010 World Junior Squash Championships official site 
World Squash Federation official website

 
Squash tournaments
Squash records and statistics
World youth sports competitions